Jatia is a locality in the city of Guwahati. It is speculated  to be the ancient capital of Assam,  known under the  name of Pragjyotishpura. The locality is a suburb of Guwahati, though it is claimed that the name Jatia itself is the remnant of archaic name pragjyotisa.

Famous residents of Jatia include late Padum Barua (maker of the Assamese realist film Ganga Silonir Pakhi), Kanak Sen Deka (editor of the Assamese Newspaper Agradoot), Ratna Singha (First Manipuri woman Superintendent of Police) 
. The Dispur Manipuri Nupi Marup is headquartered in Jatia.  Ms. Bemarai Singha is the President of this non-governmental organisation which is involved in  pioneering work for Manipuri women.

Cities and towns in Kamrup district
Neighbourhoods in Guwahati